Marquis Xi of Cai (蔡釐侯) (died 761 BC), given name Suǒshi (所事), was the eight ruler of the State of Cai from 809 BC  to 761 BC.  He was the only known son of Marquis Yi of Cai (蔡夷侯), his predecessor. His reign lasted for 48 years, the longest reign in Cai history.  He was succeeded by his son.

References
Shiji

Zhou dynasty nobility
Cai (state)
761 BC deaths
9th-century BC Chinese monarchs
8th-century BC Chinese monarchs
Year of birth unknown